Isabella Levina Lueen (born 1 May 1991), better known mononymously as Levina, is a German singer-songwriter. She represented Germany in the Eurovision Song Contest 2017 in Kyiv with the song "Perfect Life" and finished in 25th place with 6 points in the final.

Life and career
Levina was born in Bonn as Isabella Lueen, and was raised in Chemnitz. She attended the Dr.-Wilhelm-André-Gymnasium, and graduated with an International Baccalaureate degree from the Impington Village College in Cambridge (UK) in 2009. She then moved to London where she earned her bachelor's degree from King's College London. She splits her time between Berlin and London, where she studies music management at the London College of Music.

Eurovision Song Contest 2017
In 2016, Levina was announced as one of the 33 shortlisted acts for Unser Song 2017. On 6 January 2017, she was confirmed to be one of the five finalists. During the show, Levina performed a cover of "When We Were Young" by Adele for the cover round. She ended up advancing to the final as the sole artist left, performing the songs "Wildfire" and "Perfect Life". As the German public chose the latter as the winner, Levina performed "Perfect Life" at the Eurovision Song Contest 2017 in Kyiv. As Germany is a member of the "Big Five", she automatically advanced to the final, held on 13 May 2017.

Discography

Studio albums

Extended plays

Singles

References

External links

Eurovision Song Contest entrants of 2017
Eurovision Song Contest entrants for Germany
Living people
1991 births
German women pop singers
Musicians from Bonn
Alumni of King's College London
People from Chemnitz
German expatriates in England
Academics of the University of West London
21st-century German women singers